Thado of Mrauk-U(Arakanese:သတိုးမင်းတရား,  was a king of the Mrauk-U Dynasty of Arakan.

References

Bibliography
 
 
 
 

Monarchs of Mrauk-U
17th century in Burma
17th-century Burmese monarchs